Buddleja myriantha is a species endemic to upper Burma and western China, including Tibet, where it grows along forest edges, thickets and streams at altitudes of 2,000 – 3,200 m.  The species was first described and named by Diels in 1912.

Description
Buddleja myriantha is deciduous shrub growing 1 – 3 m in height, with subquadrangular, glabrescent branchlets bearing opposite leaves, 5 – 20 cm long by 0.9 – 6 cm wide, narrowly elliptic, acuminate at the apex, cuneate or decurrent at the base, the margins serrate or entire. The often fragrant inflorescences are slender, thyrsoid, almost cylindrical, 6 – 22 cm long by 1.2 – 3 cm wide. The colour of the flowers ranges from purple through violet, to white. The corollas are 5 – 7 mm long. 2n = 76.

Buddleja myriantha most closely resembles Buddleja albiflora, and it can be distinguished by its four-angled stems and tomentose exterior to the corolla tube.

Cultivation
Buddleja myriantha is grown in the UK. A specimen is grown at the Royal Botanic Gardens Edinburgh.

Suppliers
The shrub is purportedly in commerce in the UK and beyond, although the plants in question are not believed to be B. myriantha.

References

Li, P. T. & Leeuwenberg, A. J. M. (1996). Loganiaceae, in Wu, Z. & Raven, P. (eds) Flora of China, Vol. 15. Science Press, Beijing, and Missouri Botanical Garden Press, St. Louis, USA.  online at www.efloras.org

myriantha
Flora of Myanmar
Flora of China
Flora of Tibet